Helmut Schmuck (born 7 April 1963) is an Austrian long-distance runner. He competed in the men's marathon at the 1992 Summer Olympics.

References

1963 births
Living people
Athletes (track and field) at the 1992 Summer Olympics
Austrian male long-distance runners
Austrian male marathon runners
Olympic athletes of Austria
Place of birth missing (living people)
Austrian male mountain runners
World Mountain Running Championships winners